Dalsenget was a tram stop and terminus on the Elgeseter Line of the Trondheim Tramway between 1923 and 1983 and the site of a tram depot during this period.

History
In 1923 a new tram line was built to Elgeseter and a new depot was built at the terminus. After the closure of the tram line the depot building was converted to an office building and is now owned by KLP Eiendom.

Trondheim Tramway stations